State Route 30 (SR 30) is a  state highway that travels west-to-east through portions of Marion, Sumter, Crisp, Wilcox, Dodge, Telfair, Wheeler, Montgomery, Toombs, Tattnall, Evans, Bryan, Effingham, and Chatham counties in the south-central part of the U.S. state of Georgia. The highway connects the southern part of Marion County with Port Wentworth, via Americus, Cordele, Abbeville, McRae, Vidalia, Reidsville, Claxton, and Pembroke. The highway is concurrent with U.S. Route 280 (US 280) for about four-fifths of its length, from Americus to Blitchton, which is the easternmost  of US 280's length.

Route description

Marion and Sumter counties
SR 30 begins at an intersection with SR 41 south-southeast of Buena Vista, in the south-central part of Marion County. The highway travels southeast through rural areas of the county and enters Sumter County. In Friendship is an intersection with SR 153. About  later is the northern terminus of SR 45. Then, it continues to the southeast and curves to the east-northeast, to enter Americus. In the northern part of the city, it begins a concurrency with US 19/SR 3 (North Martin Luther King Boulevard). The three highways travel south-southeast, curve to the southwest, and reach West Lamar Street. At this intersection, SR 30 departs the concurrency by turning left onto US 280/SR 27/SR 49. In the main part of the city is an intersection with SR 377 (Lee Street). After passing Oak Grove Cemetery, SR 49 departs to the north on Tripp Street. Less than  later, SR 27 departs to the east on Vienna Road, while US 280/SR 30 curve to the southeast. The concurrency passes Brickyard Plantation Golf Club and enters Leslie, where SR 195 (North Bailey Avenue) joins the concurrency. They curve to the east and enter De Soto. In this city, SR 195 departs the concurrency on North Luke Street. After a slight bend to the east-northeast, US 280/SR 30 travel through Cobb and cross over Lake Blackshear into Crisp County on the Gen. Howell Cobb–Capt. John A. Cobb Memorial Bridge.

Crisp and Wilcox counties
On the eastern side of the bridge, they skirt along the northern edge of Georgia Veterans State Park. After a short southeast section, they curve to the east. Then, they curve to the northeast and back to the east, where they enter Cordele. In downtown, they intersect US 41/SR 7/SR 90 (7th Street). At this intersection, SR 90 joins the concurrency. They gradually bend to the east-southeast and have an interchange with Interstate 75 (I-75). Less than  later, SR 90 departs the concurrency. US 280/SR 30 travel in a fairly eastern routing and enter Wilcox County. They cross over the Alapaha River and enter Pitts. At 10th Street, they meet the northern terminus of SR 159. Just over  later, SR 215 joins the concurrency. Shortly farther along their route, they enter Rochelle, where they intersect SR 112/SR 233 (Ashley Street). At this intersection, SR 215 leaves the concurrency to the south. After leaving the city, the concurrency travels to a northeastern direction and enters Abbeville, where is an intersection with US 129/SR 11 (Broad Street). Before leaving the city, they pass Riverside Cemetery. A little under  after leaving the city, they cross over the Ocmulgee River into Dodge County.

Dodge and Telfair counties
In Copeland, they meet the southern terminus of SR 87. Farther along, in Rhine, is an intersection with SR 117/SR 165 (Central Street). At this intersection, SR 165 joins the concurrency. They travel through rural areas of the county and enter Milan, inside which the concurrency enters Telfair County. SR 165 departs the concurrency to the south on Mt. Zion Street. The concurrency heads east-northeast into McRae. In the southern part of town, they intersect US 319/US 441/SR 31, which join the concurrency. In downtown, the five highways intersect US 23/US 341/SR 27. Right after leaving town, they cross over the Little Ocmulgee River into Wheeler County.

Wheeler and Montgomery counties
On the southeastern corner of Little Ocmulgee State Park, US 280/SR 30 continue to the northeast, while the other three routes turn to the north-northeast. In Erick, the concurrency meets the northern terminus of SR 149. Then, in Alamo, is an intersection with SR 126 (Commerce Street). In Glenwood is an intersection with SR 19 (2nd Street). Then, they cross over the Oconee River on the LCPL Melvin Poole Memorial Bridge into Montgomery County. In Mount Vernon is an intersection with US 221/SR 56 (Railroad Avenue). The concurrency travels through nearby Ailey and enters Higgston. Here is an intersection with SR 15/SR 29 (James Street), which join the concurrency. This intersection also marks the northern terminus of SR 135. The four highways enter Vidalia and, a short distance later, enter Toombs County. At Adams Street, they intersect SR 130. At Jackson Street, SR 15/SR 29 depart the concurrency to the south-southwest, while US 280/SR 30 continue to the southeast, traveling south of Meadows Regional Medical Center and north of Vidalia Regional Airport. In nearby Lyons is an intersection with US 1/SR 4 (State Street). Then, they curve to the southeast and leave the city. They travel through rural areas of the county and enter Tattnall County.

Tattnall and Evans counties
Farther to the southeast, they skirt along the southwestern edge of Gordonia-Alatamaha State Park and enter Reidsville. There, US 280/SR 30 meet the southern terminus of SR 56 (Shepards Bridge Road) before they curve to the northeast. Almost immediately after the end of the curve is the northern terminus SR 147 (Tattnall Street). About  later is an intersection with SR 23/SR 57/SR 121 (Main Street). The concurrent highway continue to the northeast, traveling south of Manassas and curve to the east to enter Evans County. In Bellville, is an intersection with SR 169 (Smith Street). Just outside the eastern city limits is the eastern terminus of SR 292. They travel through Hagan before entering Claxton. At North Ralph Street, SR 129 joins the concurrency. Just under  later is an intersection with US 25/US 301/SR 73 (Duval Street). At South River Street, SR 129 departs from the concurrency to the south. In Daisy, they meet the northern terminus of former SR 250 (now known as Ellerbee Avenue). Farther to the east-southeast, they cross over the Canoochee River into Bryan County on the Moores Bridge.

Bryan County
US 280/SR 30 pass the Jerry Bacon Recreational Park. Continuing east-southeast, they enter Pembroke. At Main Street, SR 67 (from the left side of the concurrent highways) and SR 119 (from the right side) both join the concurrency. One block later, at College Street, those two highways depart the concurrency, traveling in opposite directions from how they joined (SR 67 turns right, while SR 119 turns left). Farther along, in Lanier, they meet the western terminus of SR 204 and curve to a more northeasterly direction. They travel southeast of Black Creek Golf Course. Then, they have an interchange with I-16 (Jim Gillis Historic Savannah Parkway). Just over  later, in Blitchton, they intersect US 80/SR 26. At this intersection, US 280 reaches its eastern terminus, and SR 30 turns right onto US 80/SR 26 east. The three highways cross over the Ogeechee River into Effingham County.

Effingham and Chatham counties
After traveling through Eden, they intersect SR 17. At this intersection, US 80/SR 26/SR 17 south continue to the east-southeast, while SR 17/SR 30 travel to the north-northwest. Approximately  later, SR 30 splits off to the southeast on Noel C. Conaway Road. It curves to the northeast and back to a fairly eastward routing. Farther along, it enters Port Wentworth at the Chatham County line. North-northwest of the main part of town, it intersects SR 21 (Augusta Road). The two routes head concurrently to the south-southeast and have an interchange with I-95 (Tom Coleman Highway). They meet Jimmy DeLoach Parkway, which is the southern terminus of SR 17 and the northern terminus of SR 21 Alternate (SR 21 Alt.). At Bonnybridge Road, SR 30 turns left and departs the concurrency. It travels underneath, but does not have an interchange with SR 21 Alt. (Jimmy DeLoach Connector). Just over  after departing from SR 21, it meets its eastern terminus, an intersection with SR 25 (Coastal Highway).

National Highway System
There are two portions of SR 30 that are part of the National Highway System, a system of routes determined to be the most important for the nation's economy, mobility, and defense:
 From the western end of the US 19/SR 3 concurrency in Americus to where US 280/SR 30 meet I-95, just southwest of Blitchton
 All of SR 30, from the western end of the SR 21 concurrency in Port Wentworth, to its eastern terminus

History

1920s and 1930s
SR 30 was established at least as early as 1919 on its current path from SR 7 in Cordele to the approximate location of Daisy, then east-southeast to SR 38 in Clyde, and then southeast, east-northeast, and northeast to Savannah. At this time, part of SR 26 was established from Blitchton to Savannah. By the end of September 1921, SR 63 was established from SR 30 in Ellabell northeast to SR 26 in Blitchton. The eastern terminus of SR 38 was truncated to SR 25 in Midway. Its former path was redesignated as a northern extension of SR 25. By October 1926, the western terminus of SR 30 was extended northwest to SR 28 west of Vienna. The western terminus of SR 63 was shifted westward to Lanier. US 80 was designated on SR 26 from Blitchton to Savannah. The eastern terminus of SR 30 was truncated to US 17/SR 25 southeast of Clyde. Its former path was redesignated as a northern extension of SR 25, with US 17 designated on it. Between October 1929 and June 1930, the western terminus of SR 30 was shifted west-southwestward to Americus. The western terminus of SR 63 was shifted westward to Pembroke. Between November 1930 and January 1932, US 280 was designated on SR 30 from Americus to Pembroke, on the entire length of SR 63 from Pembroke to Blitchton, and on US 80/SR 26 from Blitchton to Savannah. In the third quarter of 1937, the paths of SR 30, from Pembroke to southeast of Clyde, and SR 63 were swapped.

1940s to 1980s
In 1942, the eastern terminus of US 280 was truncated to Blitchton. The next year, the western terminus of SR 30 was extended northwest to SR 41 south of Buena Vista. Between January 1945 and November 1946, the eastern terminus of SR 30 was extended southeastward on US 80/SR 26 from Blitchton to the southern part of Effingham County, north-northwestward on SR 167 for a short distance, eastward to SR 21 north-northwest of Industrial City Gardens, south-southeastward on SR 21 for a short distance, and eastward to the Savannah National Wildlife Refuge. Between August 1950 and January 1952, SR 167 was redesignated as SR 17. Between June 1963 and January 1966, the entire length of SR 30 was hard surfaced. In 1973, SR 704 was proposed from SR 30 west-northwest of Monteith east-northeast to SR 21 north-northwest of Monteith. Between January 1979 and March 1980, the path of SR 30 in the Monteith area was shifted northward, replacing the proposed path of SR 704.

Major intersections

Pitts connector route

State Route 30 Connector (SR 30 Conn.) was a connector route of SR 30 that partially existed in the city limits of Pitts. Between June 1963 and January 1966, it was established on Cleveland Avenue from SR 215 in Pitts east and southeast to US 280/SR 30/SR 215 east of the city. In 1997, it was decommissioned.

See also

References

External links

 
 Georgia Roads (Routes 21 - 40)

030
Transportation in Marion County, Georgia
Transportation in Sumter County, Georgia
Transportation in Crisp County, Georgia
Transportation in Wilcox County, Georgia
Transportation in Dodge County, Georgia
Transportation in Telfair County, Georgia
Transportation in Wheeler County, Georgia
Transportation in Montgomery County, Georgia
Transportation in Toombs County, Georgia
Transportation in Tattnall County, Georgia
Transportation in Evans County, Georgia
Transportation in Bryan County, Georgia
Transportation in Effingham County, Georgia
Transportation in Chatham County, Georgia
Vidalia, Georgia, micropolitan area